Amstor Retail Group is a commercial property management company in Ukraine that operates 13 shopping centres in seven cities in central and eastern Ukraine.

In 2015, after a corporate conflict with the minority shareholder, Amstor redirected its business from retail to commercial real estate management. The total area of the shopping centres is over 180,000 square meters. 

The chain was 70% owned by Smart-Holding. Amstor LLC was declared bankrupt by the decision of the Commercial Court of Dnipropetrovsk Oblast in 2019. In December 2020 Madera Development acquired several shopping centers, land and commercial equipment from Amstor at an auction in the Prozorro.Sales system. 
On 27th June 2022, Russia committed a terrorist attack against Amstor in Kremenchuk city. It was bombed by an X-22 rocket  from Kurskaya Oblast, Russia. It was damaged and by the 30th June 2022, 18 people died and 36 were still missing.

History 
Amstor  was founded by the Ukrainian businessman Volodymyr Vahorovskyi. Between 2004 and 2014, Amstor became a leading retail chains in Ukraine, with 38 supermarkets and shopping centres in seven regions. One of its competitive advantages was high quality and healthy products of own production. Amstor won the confidence of buyers due to its attention to cleanliness and quality control.

According to the Ukraine consulting company  GT Partners in 2012, Amstor entered the top 10 food operators in Ukraine: the chain was ranked 8th in turnover and 9th in total retail space. In 2014, the total retail space accounted to 103 thousand square meters and the total area of all the shopping centres more than 300 thousand square meters.

The first store opened in Donetsk on 28 August, 2003. By the end of 2007, there were 19 Amstor shops in the East of Ukraine, 22 shopping centres were under development. In the meanwhile, the company was developing the format of a grocery hypermarket with the sales area of 3000–6000 m2.

By the end of 2009, Amstor chain included 26 shopping malls in 5 regions of Ukraine with total area of 305,8 thousand square meters:
Donetsk region – 15
Zaporizhzhia  – 7
Mykolaiv – 2
Luhansk – 1
Poltava – 1

In 2009, there were more than 8000 employees and the turnover of the company reached 3 billion UAH.

Starting from 2009, approximately 280 million UAH (about 30 million USD) of own funds of the company were invested into development.

In 2012, Amstor chain became national. On December 20 Amstor entered the market of Kyiv with a new format – the first in Ukraine "supermarket of taste". In the following two years 2 more "supermarkets of taste" were opened in the capital. The retail area of one "supermarket of taste" was 1000-2500 m2.

In October 25, 2013, Amstor was opened in Dnepropetrovsk. In 2014, it had eight supermarkets in Donetsk, Makiivka, Sviatohirsk and Yasynuvata. These were Amstor supermarkets with retail area of 200-600 sq. m. in densely populated areas of the cities.  It was present in 38 shopping centres in seven regions of Ukraine. It was planned to open new Amstors in many other cities of Ukraine in 2014, but the beginning of the War in Donbas in Eastern Ukraine in 2014, as well as a corporate conflict of the major shareholder "Smart Holding" (70% stock) with the minor shareholder Volodymyr Vahorovskyi around Amstor,  which began in December 2014, stopped these plans.

On 27 June 2022, an Amstor premises was hit by a Russian missile during the 2022 Kremenchuk missile strike.

Attraction of Smart-Holding into Amstor business 
The economic recession of 2008, along with the devaluation of the domestic currency and a rapid decrease in customers’ purchasing ability placed Amstor on the edge of bankruptcy, and forces business partners Shifrin and Vahorovskyi  to turn to Vadym Novynskyi for support. They offered him 70% of Amstor's stock in exchange for an injection of working capital and aid in restructuring of the company's excessive credit portfolio. Novynskyi's company Smart-Holding provided a $3 million stabilization loan, and in return they each retained 15% of the company's stock. In 2009-2011, Novynskyi injected about $30.5 million into Amstor, and Smart-Holding concluded suretyship agreements to $50 million under the company's loans with the banks.

These funds were considered by the major shareholder as a necessary  loan for the development of the business group. In addition, the undistributed profit, the biggest part of which belonged to Smart-Holding, was reinvested into the retailer's development. Smart-Holding did not ever receive dividends from Amstor's business operations.

New impulse in Amstor chain's development 
With support from Smart-Holding in 2009-2011, the financial condition of Amstor chain became stable, its major credit portfolio was restructured, and the value of its bonds for 2010-2013, mainly nominated in US dollars, was reduced by $55 million. From 2010, the retail chain of Amstor, being purely regional operator based in Donetsk and Zaporizhzhia regions of Ukraine before, started its expansion to other regions of Ukraine. 
In 2012, Amstor's first supermarket in Kyiv was opened. Later, two more Amstors were opened there. The retailer gained the status of a national operator.

During 2009-2013, the number of branded Amstor outlets grew from 23 to 38. Further penetration into the market of the western Ukraine was planned. The total value of all the company's assets at the beginning of 2014 amounted to about $200 million (the exchange rate being 8 UAH per 1 USD). Amstor consolidated its position amidst top 10 retailers of Ukraine.

With consent of the majority shareholder of Smart-Holding, Volodymyr Vahorovskyi remained the actual executive officer of Amstor retail group. His younger brother, Alexandr, was nominated as acting CEO of the chain. Smart-Holding participated in the development of the company as a core investor that made strategic decisions regarding the chain's development and managed Amstor company through its representatives in the Supervisory Board. At the same time, throughout the period of partnership with Smart-Holding, Vahorovskyi continued to manage the chain single-handedly, which later resulted in the conflict between the shareholders of Amstor retail chain.

Corporate conflict 
The conflict between the majority shareholder of Amstor, Smart-Holding (70% stock), and the minority shareholder, ex-manager of Amstor Volodymyr Vahorovskyi (15% stock), was caused by the latter wishing to withdraw the majority shareholder from participation in Amstor's business.

The scheme of Smart-Holding's ouster from participation in the business was as follows:

In March 2014, Volodymyr Vahorovskyi, without the consent of the senior partner, founded Amstor Trade LLC, which according to his scheme was meant to become a new parent company of the retail group, to which not only the business of the retailer, but also all the real estate and transport belonging to Amstor would gradually be transferred. The name of the new company was almost identical to that founded and accorded with the majority shareholder half a year prior. The only difference was the absence of a hyphen in the name. The legal entity accorded with Smart-Holding was Amstor-Trade LLC, whereas its fictitious equivalent was named Amstor Trade LLC. All this remitted attention of the majority shareholder and considerably eased accordance of Vahorovskyi's further steps.

Throughout the year 2014, taking the advantage of making some decisions single-handedly, Volodymyr Vahorovskyi carried out several transactions to put his plan of the business appropriation into effect. To fill up the capital of Amstor Trade LLC Vahorovskyi made several dubious fiscal transactions. One of them, for instance, was purchase of junk securities from Lancelot LLC to UAH15 million by Amstor Trade House upon Vahorovskyi's instruction. After several transactions made during just one day, the mentioned amount, finally reached the accounts of the newly founded Amstor Trade LLC in the form of a loan.

At the same period, the Vahorovskyis created an artificial indebtedness of Amstor LLC in favour of Amstor Trade LLC. Amstor LLC possessed all the real estate belonging to the group of companies, in particular the trade outlets as the key assets. In the future, in case of Amstor LLC's bankruptcy, the new entity could claim its rights to all the shopping centres.

Gradually, all the cash flows of the retail chain were transferred to Amstor Trade LLC. All the suppliers were made to work with the new company.

Later on, shortly before the open stage of the corporate conflict, the Vahorovskyis brothers made a deal to “sell” the Group's trademarks to the newly established companies controlled by them. During the same period, the inventory and equipment of Amstor supermarkets were “sold” and “re-registered” to these companies. Similar schemes were used when withdrawing vehicles and expensive special machinery that belonged to the retail chain.

Up to a certain moment, the minority shareholder could explain all these actions to Smart-Holding by allegedly accorded operations aimed at consolidation and enhancement of the business transparency. At the same time, the fiscal controllers from Smart-Holding were not given access to Amstor's financial statements. Eventually, the majority shareholder was completely disconnected from 1C enterprise accounting system.

Open stage of the corporate conflict 
In November 2014, Smart-Holding noticed some photos of receipts from Amstor outlets located in the territory not controlled by Ukraine (ATO zone), from which “Amstor Trade House” name disappeared, and the VAT equalled to 0%. The majority shareholder – Smart-Holding – did not give its consent to any changes, though. Consequently, the operational activity of the retail chain, in particular, the financial and business activity of Volodymyr Vahorovskyi, was subject to audit. It revealed that money from Amstor's accounts was transferred to some fake companies.

For instance, Volodymyr Vahorovskyi used part of the money to buy an apartment in Hrushevsky Street in Kyiv, an expensive car, etc. However, the essence of his plan was not only his personal enrichment, but also appropriation of the entire business despite the interests of other shareholders owning 85% stock in the retail chain.

One part of Vahorovskyi's plot was Premiumtorg, a company founded in Donetsk in October 2014 that worked within the legal framework of Donetsk People's Republic (DPR or DNR). Receipts from the retailer's supermarkets, published in social media in December 2014 by ordinary customers, as well as other documents discovered later, during the search by militia in V. Vahorovskyi's premises, were evidence to that. The proceeds from these 18 outlets were not debited and were actually appropriated by the ex-managers.

When the majority shareholder revealed all these facts, Smart-Holding removed the Vahorovskyis from the management and assigned new managers to all the branches of Amstor chain. At the end of 2014, representatives of Smart-Holding attempted to enter Amstor supermarkets and announce changes, carry on the fiscal audit (primary documents) and audit of goods. However, armed people acting under command of the Vahorovskyis blocked access to the stores. All that led to suspension in the supermarkets’ operations – neither representatives of Smart-Holding nor the employees were allowed in. The representatives of Smart-Holding received access to the stores only on 9 January 2015. Ten days were enough for the Vahorovskyis to cover up traces of embezzlement and not to let the auditors access the primary documents: IT infrastructure of Amstor was destroyed, servers were removed and carried away, labour books of employees disappeared, contacts of suppliers and accounting papers were destroyed.

Amstor LLC was declared bankrupt by the decision of the Commercial Court of Dnipropetrovsk Oblast of July 23, 2019. In December 2020 Madera Development, whose ultimate beneficiary is Ihor Mazepa, acquired several shopping centers, land and commercial equipment from Amstor at an auction in the Prozorro.Sales system.

Amstor outlets in the ATO zone 
18 stores of Amstor Retail Group are located in the ATO zone. For a long time they had worked under control of Vahorovskyi, who managed to make a deal with leaders of the temporarily occupied territory of Donetsk. Later, Vahorovskyi was deprived of Amstor shops in the DNR (the so-called Donetsk People's Republic (DNR)) territory by local militants.

Amstor Retail Group, operating in the territory of Ukraine and controlled by Smart-Holding, is planning to regain control over 18 stores in the ATO zone after the conflict in the East of Ukraine has been settled.

Current state of Amstor  

During 2015, it took Smart-Holding considerable effort to stabilize the work of 20 stores in the territory controlled by Ukraine. More than UAH150 million was spent on that. All the employees of the supermarkets that were idle were paid salaries during the entire period. This was financial aid from the enterprises of Smart-Holding. During this time the IT infrastructure was restored, debts to the employees of Amstor were paid off, the question of indebtedness to Amstor's suppliers was settled.

In July 2015, Smart-Holding and Fozzy Group reached an agreement to implement a joint project to fully restore the operations of Amstor retail chain. This related to the stores located in Ukrainian government controlled areas. The project has been brought off and the stores have been restored. As of now they are operating under Silpo brand with Amstor shopping outlets preserving their original name. In addition to the anchor tenant Silpo, the stores of Amstor Retail Group have given space to numerous representatives of small and medium-size businesses.

According to the information from Smart-Holding, the following outlets operate in Amstor retail chain as of the beginning of 2016:

When the mentioned corporate conflict broke out, 14 out of 20 stores in the territory controlled by Ukraine were located in the shopping centers owned by Amstor, and six stores were placed on the rented area. After the corporate conflict was over and Smart-Holding regained control over the Group's stores as well as following the agreement on joint development of the retail chain with Fozzy Group, the situation is as follows:

Previously rented areas:
 Kyiv, 3 supermarkets – Silpos were opened in two of them, ATB-market was placed in the remaining one
 Zaporizhzhia – one supermarket Varus 
 Dnipro - one supermarket Silpo
 Sviatohirsk – one supermarket - closed

References

External links
 Official site

Retailing in Ukraine
Companies of Ukraine